Coelogyne mooreana is a species of orchid.

mooreana